Hills generally refers to a series of raised landforms.

Hills may also refer to:

Places

Australia 
 Hills District, New South Wales

United States 
 Hills, Iowa
 Hills, Minnesota
 Hills, Ohio
 Hills Fork, a stream in Ohio

Music
 "Hills", a song by Frank La Forge
 "Hills", a song by Kim Petras

Other uses
 Hills (store), an American department store chain
 Hills (surname)
 Hills Centre, an entertainment centre in Castle Hill, New South Wales
 Hills Christian Life Centre (now Hillsong Church), commonly nicknamed Hills
 Hills cloud a circumstellar disc, interior to the Oort cloud
 Hills Industries, an Australian diversified manufacturer, best known for the Hills Hoist clothesline
 Hill's Pet Nutrition, an American pet food company
 Hills Supermarkets, an American market chain

See also
 The Hills (disambiguation)
 Hill (disambiguation)